Khan FM (birth name: Faraz Khan) is a digital influencer and Spotify's artist and label partnerships manager for Pakistan, Sri Lanka and Bangladesh. He is also the frontman of the UAE-based band, Chronicles of Khan.

Early life and career 
Khan FM started his career as a TV presenter for music videos and artists from South Asia. After working on various music festivals, concerts in his early twenties, he worked for Red Bull Music as a Culture Marketing Manager.

He formed his band Chronicles of Khan in 2018. Khan has also played a pivotal role in promoting Coke Studio Season 14 on Spotify. He was also one of the speakers at Spotify's First Masterclass for Artist Community of Pakistan.

References 

Internet celebrities
Social media influencers
Living people
Year of birth missing (living people)